Bohemia is a small unincorporated community  located in the delta of the Mississippi River in the parish of Plaquemines, Louisiana, United States. The unincorporated community was affected in 2005 by Hurricane Katrina. Before Katrina made landfall, the community had a population of about 200 people, but the hurricane left only 25 homes standing.

Education
Plaquemines Parish School Board operates public schools serving the community. The K-12 school Phoenix High School is in Braithwaite and serves Bohemia.

References

Unincorporated communities in Plaquemines Parish, Louisiana
Unincorporated communities in New Orleans metropolitan area
Unincorporated communities in Louisiana
Louisiana populated places on the Mississippi River